Adventure Time: Pirates of the Enchiridion is an action-adventure video game developed by Climax Studios and published by Outright Games. It was released in July 2018 for Nintendo Switch, PlayStation 4, Windows, and Xbox One, on Amazon Luna in December 2021, and on Google Stadia in March 2022, and is based on the television series Adventure Time, which aired from 2010 to 2018 on Cartoon Network.

Overview 
Finn and Jake wake up to discover that the Land of Ooo has been mysteriously flooded, and set off on an adventure to fix the flood. Players use a boat in open-environment sailing to reach the main areas of the game, where RPG turn-based combat occurs. The game also features an occasional cross-examination minigame, where Finn and Jake must interrogate villains, in "good cop, bad cop" fashion.

Development 
The game was announced on December 14, 2017. A trailer for the game was released on April 26, 2018.

Reception 
On Metacritic, the PlayStation 4, Xbox One, and Nintendo Switch versions of Adventure Time: Pirates of the Enchiridion have respective scores of 62%, 66%, and 50%, all indicating "mixed or average" reviews.

Giving the game a 5.8/10, IGN called it "a good game for beginners, and we get a small taste of how great exploring the show’s world and quirky characters could be. But the lack of challenge and options will probably bore veterans."

References 

2018 video games
Windows games
Nintendo Switch games
PlayStation 4 games
Xbox One games
Climax Group games
Open-world video games
Video games developed in the United Kingdom
Pirates of the Enchiridion
Action-adventure games
Single-player video games
Video games about pirates
Video games with cel-shaded animation
Cartoon Network video games
Outright Games games